Karamba! is the twelfth studio album by Bosnian rock band Zabranjeno Pušenje, released through Zenica-based records Tropik and streaming platforms on June 3, 2022.

Recording and production 
In 2020 and 2021, the band recorded sixteen new songs for the double album in the Plavi Film Studio in Zagreb, Croatia. The arrangement of all songs on the album was jointly signed by Sejo Sexon, Toni Lović, and all other members of the group. The only guest on the album is Croatian blues musician and harmonica player Tomislav Goluban. The band is collaborating with Elvis J. Kurtović on this album for the first time after a 15-year break. Elvis J. Kurtović was a band member during the 1990s.

One of the authors of the song "Ne okreći se sine", Goran Kostić, died in 2017.

Release and promotion 
The band announced the double album with a new single and music video for the song "Ekrem". The music video was directed by Tomislav Fiket and the actor Asim Ugljen is in the title character of Ekrem.

Previously, in June 2020, a music video was released for the song "Korona hit pozitivan". The song was made in collaboration with Elvis J. Kurtović, a former band member, and was added to the album.

Track listing 
Source: ZAMP, Discogs

Personnel 

Zabranjeno pušenje
Sejo Sexon – lead vocals, backing vocals
Toni Lović – electric guitar, acoustic guitar
Branko Trajkov Trak – drums, percussion, backing vocals
Robert Boldižar – violin, cello, keyboards, backing vocals
Dejan Orešković Klo – bass
Angie Zebec  – vocals, backing vocals, percussion

Additional musicians
 Tomislav Goluban – harmonica (tracks Disc One: 6; Disc Two: 1, 2, 5)

Production
 Sejo Sexon – production, arrangement
 Toni Lović – production, arrangement, programming, sound engineering, audio mixing, mastering
 Dejan Orešković – arrangement
 Robert Boldižar – arrangement
 Branko Trajkov – arrangement
 Dario Vitez – executive production
 Mateo Patekar – technician 
 Krešimir Jurina – technician 
 Domagoj Marušić "Brada" – technician

Design
Tomislav Fiket – design 
Ideologija (design studio in Sarajevo, BH) – layout
Saša Midžor Sučić – photos

References

External links 
 Karamba! at Discogs

2022 albums
Zabranjeno Pušenje albums